Jeffrey Ross Toobin (born May 21, 1960) is an American lawyer, author, blogger, and longtime legal analyst for CNN. He announced his exit from CNN in August 2022.

During the Iran–Contra affair, Toobin served as an associate counsel on this investigation in the Department of Justice. He moved from government and the practice of law into full-time writing during the 1990s, when he published his first books. He wrote for The New Yorker from 1993 to 2020. He was fired that fall for masturbating on-camera during a ZOOM video conference call with co-workers. He continued to serve as legal analyst for CNN for two years.

Toobin has written several books, including accounts of the 1970s Patty Hearst kidnapping and time with the SLA, the O. J. Simpson murder case, and the Clinton–Lewinsky scandal. The latter two were adapted for television as seasons of FX's American Crime Story, with the Simpson case premiering in 2016.

Early life
Toobin was born to a Jewish-American family in New York City in 1960, a son of Marlene Sanders, former ABC News and CBS News correspondent, and Jerome Toobin, a news broadcasting producer. His younger brother, Mark, born in 1967 with Down syndrome, has lived apart from the family.

Toobin attended Columbia Grammar & Preparatory School. While attending Harvard College for undergraduate studies, he covered sports for The Harvard Crimson. His column was titled "Inner Toobin". Toobin graduated magna cum laude with a Bachelor of Arts degree in American history and literature and was awarded a Harry S. Truman Scholarship. 

He attended Harvard Law School, where classmates included Elena Kagan, and he served as an editor of the Harvard Law Review. He graduated in 1986 with a J.D. magna cum laude.

Career 

Toobin began freelancing for The New Republic while a law student. After passing the bar exam, he worked as a law clerk to U.S. circuit judge J. Edward Lumbard of the U.S. Court of Appeals for the Second Circuit. Next he served as an associate counsel for Independent Counsel Lawrence Walsh during the Iran–Contra affair and Oliver North's criminal trial. He moved to serve as an Assistant United States Attorney for the Eastern District of New York in Brooklyn.

Toobin wrote a book, Opening Arguments: A Young Lawyer's First Case: United States v. Oliver North (1991), about his work in the Office of Independent Counsel, to which Walsh objected. Toobin had been required to sign multiple agreements to protect the confidentiality of grand jury and internal proceedings of the office. But he had taken thousands of pages of notes with him and based his book on such information, revealing material that Walsh believed should have been held as private. Toobin went to court to affirm his right to publish. Judge John F. Keenan of the United States District Court for the Southern District of New York wrote an opinion that Toobin and his publisher had the right to release this book. The book was published before Walsh's appeal could be decided, mooting the case.  Accordingly, the Circuit Court vacated the lower court's decision and ordered the dismissal of the case.

After three years as an Assistant U.S. Attorney, Toobin resigned from the U.S. Attorney's office in Brooklyn, and abandoned "the practice of law." He started working as a writer in 1993 at The New Yorker and in 1996 became a television legal analyst for ABC.

Toobin has provided broadcast legal analysis on several high-profile cases. In 1994, Toobin broke the story in The New Yorker that the legal defense team in O. J. Simpson's criminal trial planned to accuse Mark Fuhrman of the LAPD of planting evidence. Toobin provided analysis of Michael Jackson's 2005 child molestation trial, the O. J. Simpson civil case, and independent prosecutor Kenneth Starr's investigation of President Bill Clinton. 

He published books on some of these cases: The Run of His Life: The People v OJ Simpson (1997), and A Vast Conspiracy (1999), about the investigation of Clinton for the Monica Lewinsky sex scandal. Each of these books was later adapted for television, the Simpson case as a mini-series, and the Clinton as an episode. 

In 2000 Toobin received an Emmy Award for his coverage of the Elián González custody saga, which had resulted in the return of the boy from the United States to communist-led Cuba.

Toobin joined CNN in 2002 as a legal analyst. In 2003, he secured the first interview with Martha Stewart about the insider trading charges against her.

Toobin is the author of seven books. His book The Nine: Inside the Secret World of the Supreme Court (2007) received awards from the Columbia University Graduate School of Journalism and the Nieman Foundation for Journalism at Harvard University.

His next book was The Oath: The Obama White House and the Supreme Court (2012). American Heiress: The Kidnapping, Crimes and Trial of Patty Hearst (2016), explored events from the 1970s. All were New York Times Best Sellers. 

He wrote True Crimes and Misdemeanors, the Investigation of Donald Trump (2020), described as a "summation for the jury" against the character and presidency of Donald Trump, as if he were on trial.

Adaptations
Two of Toobin's books were adapted for television. His book on the OJ Simpson trial was adapted as The People v. O.J. Simpson: American Crime Story, a 2016 mini-series comprising the first season of the FX true-crime anthology series. 

A Vast Conspiracy (1999), about the Clinton-Lewinsky scandal, was adapted as an episode, Impeachment: American Crime Story (2021), in the FX anthology.

Resignation
On August 12, 2022, Toobin announced via Twitter that he would leave CNN after 20 years. His last day on air was August 4.

Zoom masturbation incident 
On October 19, 2020, during the first year of the Covid-19 pandemic, Toobin was suspended from The New Yorker after he masturbated on camera during a Zoom video call between New Yorker and WNYC radio staffers. 

CNN said Toobin "has asked for some time off while he deals with a personal issue, which we have granted." Toobin contended the incident was unintentional and said in a statement: "I made an embarrassingly stupid mistake, believing I was off-camera. I apologize to my wife, family, friends and co-workers." In November 2020 he was fired from The New Yorker, following an internal investigation by the parent organization, Condé Nast. New York Public Radio, which owns WNYC, indefinitely banned Toobin from its broadcasts and podcasts.

Toobin was widely ridiculed in the wake of the incident by, among others, Jimmy Fallon, Donald Trump Jr., and performers on Saturday Night Live. Defenders included Tina Brown, a former New Yorker editor, who said that "27 years of superb reporting and commitment to The New Yorker should have been weighed against an incident that horribly embarrassed the magazine but mostly embarrassed himself." Author and journalist Malcolm Gladwell said he "read the Condé Nast news release, and I was puzzled because I couldn't find any intellectual justification for what they were doing."

On June 10, 2021, Toobin returned to CNN as its chief legal analyst. He described his conduct as "deeply moronic and indefensible" and said he "didn't think other people could see [him]", but admitted that this was no defense for his behavior. He said the time he spent off air went toward "trying to be a better person", working on his upcoming book about the Oklahoma City bombing, doing therapy, and working at a food bank.

Personal life 

In 1986, Toobin married Amy Bennett McIntosh, whom he met in college while they worked at The Harvard Crimson. She is a 1980 Harvard graduate, holds an MBA degree from Harvard Business School, and has held executive positions at Verizon Communications and Zagat Survey. They have two adult children, a daughter and son.

Toobin had a longtime off-and-on extramarital affair with attorney Casey Greenfield, during which she became pregnant with his child. Toobin reportedly offered her money to have an abortion. When she refused to do so, he threatened that she would regret it if she did not comply. Greenfield is the daughter of American television journalist and author Jeff Greenfield and his first wife, Carrie Carmichael. Casey Greenfield was formerly married to screenwriter Matt Manfredi. The Greenfield-Toobin son was born in 2009; Toobin initially resisted acknowledging the boy. Toobin's paternity was confirmed with a DNA test, and a Manhattan family court judge ordered Toobin to pay child support.

Bibliography

Books

Essays and reporting 
 
 
 
 
 
 
 
 
 
 
 
 
 
 
  Methods of execution.
 
 
 
  Justice Antonin Scalia.
 
 
 
 Toobin, Jeffrey (December 11, 2017) "Michael Flynn's Guilty Plea Sends Donald Trump's Lawyers Scrambling" New Yorker.

References

External links 

 
 CNN staff biography
 October 2007 Author Series: Jeffrey Toobin in Conversation with Lori Lightfoot.
 
 Good Golly, Mr. Ollie : OPENING ARGUMENTS: A Young Lawyer's First Case: United States v. Oliver North

Toobin family
1960 births
Living people
20th-century American male writers
20th-century American non-fiction writers
21st-century American male writers
21st-century American non-fiction writers
American broadcast news analysts
American legal writers
American male non-fiction writers
American political commentators
American political writers
American television reporters and correspondents
CNN people
Columbia Grammar & Preparatory School alumni
Harvard College alumni
Harvard Law School alumni
Jewish American journalists
Journalists from New York City
Lawyers who have represented the United States government
Phillips Exeter Academy alumni
The Harvard Crimson people
The New Yorker staff writers
United States Department of Justice lawyers
21st-century American Jews